The Tony Danza Tapdance Extravaganza was an American mathcore band from Murfreesboro, Tennessee. The band was founded (sans a vocalist) in Monroe, Louisiana by members Layne Meylain, Mason Crooks, Brad Thompson, and Mike Butler.  They relocated to Murfreesboro, TN to look for a frontman and found Jessie Freeland.

The group derived their name (as a joke) from celebrity Tony Danza, upon one of his professions being tap dancing. The Tony Danza Tapdance Extravaganza released four studio albums before disbanding in 2012.

History
The Tony Danza Tapdance Extravaganza was founded in 2004. They chose their band name after actor Tony Danza; the humorous moniker is occasionally misinterpreted, as older concertgoers have attended shows in hopes of seeing Danza himself. The group signed with Corrosive Recordings in 2005 after self-releasing their debut album. Their second release, Danza II: Electric Boogaloo, was issued in 2007 on Black Market Activities. The album's name is a parody of the Danzig album, Danzig II: Lucifuge, as well as the 1980s film Breakin' 2: Electric Boogaloo. The album features short, humorous skits interspersed with the songs making fun of their surroundings growing up. The group has toured with Cattle Decapitation, Arsonists Get All the Girls, Veil of Maya, Full Blown Chaos, Despised Icon, The Acacia Strain, Beneath the Massacre, Unearth, See You Next Tuesday, The Red Chord, Shai Hulud, Psyopus, The Number 12 Looks Like You, Lye By Mistake, A Life Once Lost, and Emmure, among others. In March 2008, the band crashed their tour van after playing a show in Lewisville, Texas. Former member Brad Thomson founded Midgets with Machetes, a record label distributed by Uprising Records.

On September 24, 2009, the band announced that Layne Meylain and Mike Butler had amicably left the group. At the same time, the band formally announced their next album, Danza III: A Series of Unfortunate Events.  The album focuses on lyrical themes such as personal, social, political and global "unfortunate events" tied around the three musical themes of technical, groove-based and ambient music.  It was recorded in November 2009 with Jeremiah Scott and Steve Blackmon.

The band released their third album, Danza III: The Series of Unfortunate Events, on July 6, 2010. On the record, Josh Travis performs lead and rhythm guitar on an 8-string guitar as well as the bass. It also marks the first album by the band to include drummer Mike Bradley. The songs "I Am Sammy Jankis" and "The Union" were released as singles.

During May 2011, the band confirmed that Danza IIII is in the works. In the meantime of its creation, guitarist Josh Travis has joined Jerry Roush's new band Glass Cloud as a side-project with their debut album, The Royal Thousand, being released on July 3, 2012.

On October 16, 2012, their album Danza IIII: The Alpha – The Omega was released. Dave Mustein of MetalSucks gave the album 4.5 out of 5 stars, stating, "Danza's bottom end is the single most unified element on The Alpha The Omega. There's no denying that previous Danza releases are heavy[...] but the record's heaviness is primarily due to the fact that all the instrumentation on the album was performed by rhythmic mastermind Joshua Travis[...] The production holds it all together, sounding gritty but professional, digital but uncompressed," but criticized the band for falling "into the trap of writing filler; the numerous samples begin to run together, decreasing the impact of songs like Hold the Line. And it's almost impossible to sit through the entirety of the glitchy, gimmicky Some Things Are Better Left Unsaid."

On August 23, 2012, Joshua Travis made this statement, regarding Danza's future:

"For this album, Jessie and I were looking to create more of a visceral vibe than a completely technical vibe. There's parts that do still get a bit chaotic of course, but not nearly as much as the avid listener is used to. Everything about this record is way more to the point, with much more heart put into it rather than just seeing how many notes could be thrown into a part or seeking to create 'the heaviest shit ever' or any of that nonsense. The record being titled The Alpha – The Omega, to us symbolized the beginning and the end of Danza. Jessie and I hope you enjoy it as much as we enjoyed creating it for you all."

The band's breakup has led the members to pursue different careers. Guitarist Travis went on to join the metalcore band Glass Cloud and later, Emmure.

Band members
Final lineup
Jessie "Danza" Freeland – lead vocals 
Josh Travis – guitars 

Previous members
Layne Meylain – guitar 
Brad Thomson – guitar 
Mike Butler – bass 
Phil Lockett – bass 
Mason Crooks – drums 
Djed Cyril – drums 
Mike Bradley – drums 

 Timeline

Discography

Studio albums

Demos

Music videos

References

External links

The Tony Danza Tapdance Extravaganza at Black Market Activities

Heavy metal musical groups from Tennessee
Black Market Activities artists
American mathcore musical groups
American grindcore musical groups
Musical quartets
Musical groups established in 2004
Metalcore musical groups from Tennessee